Senator Ingram may refer to:

G. Erle Ingram (born 1883), Wisconsin State State Senate
Keith Ingram (born 1955), Arkansas State Senate
W. K. Ingram (1910–1981), Arkansas State Senate